Spider and the Fly may refer to:

Film and television
The Spider and the Fly (1916 film), an American film of 1916
The Spider and the Fly (1931 film), a Silly Symphony cartoon
Spider and the Fly (1936 film) or Rogue of the Range, an American western directed by S. Roy Luby
The Spider and the Fly (1949 film), a British crime film directed by Robert Hamer
"Spider and the Fly" (NCIS), a television episode
"The Spider and the Fly" (Spider-Man), a television episode

Literature
"The Spider and the Fly" (poem), an 1829 poem by Mary Howitt
The Spider and the Fly (DiTerlizzi book), a 2002 children's picture book by Tony DiTerlizzi
The Spider and the Fly (Rowe book), a 2017 nonfiction book by Claudia Rowe

Music
"The Spider and the Fly" (song), by the Rolling Stones, 1965
"Spider and the Fly", a 1946 song by Myra Taylor

See also
The spider and the fly problem, a mathematical puzzle with an unintuitive solution